Scott Baldwin is an American politician, businessman, and law enforcement officer who is a member of the Indiana Senate from the 20th district. He assumed office on November 18, 2020, succeeding Victoria Spartz.

Early life and education 
Baldwin is a native of Anderson, Indiana, and graduated from Madison Heights High School. After graduating from high school, Baldwin enlisted in the United States Marine Corps.

Career 
In addition to serving in the Marine Corps, Baldwin worked as an officer in the Indianapolis Metropolitan Police Department and as a corrections officer for the Indiana Department of Correction. Baldwin also served in the United States Army Reserve. Since retiring from law enforcement, Baldwin has operated IT, real estate, construction, and private security companies.  Baldwin has served on the Riverview Hospital Board of Trustees, the Hamilton County (Indiana) Health Board, the Hamilton County (Indiana) Redevelopment Commission, the Food Rescue Board of Directors, and the Crime Stoppers Board of Directors.

In 2011 and 2012, Baldwin embedded with USMC infantry unit (CONUS & OCONUS) as a law enforcement subject matter expert to advise commanders and staff on the collection, integration, analysis, and dissemination of information pertaining to criminal terrorist networks and the local dynamics of criminal radicalization.  He assisted Marine Corps personnel in identification and apprehension of high value, anti-coalition elements and narco-terrorists, forensic support, and case preparation.

On January 13, 2020, before incumbent senator Victoria Spartz declared her candidacy for the United States House of Representatives on February 5, 2020, Baldwin entered the race to challenge her. He defeated John Gaylor in the Republican primary and Democratic nominee Ronald Saunders III in the November general election.

In early 2021, Baldwin sponsored Indiana House Bill 1314, which allows title companies and individuals to invalidate discriminatory covenants such as those preventing certain races from owning real estate.

In late 2021, Baldwin was listed as an "annual member" of the far-right anti-government militia Oath Keepers in a database leak. Baldwin responded by saying that he had never been a member, but did make a $30 donation 11 years prior when the organization purported to be supportive of veterans and the 2nd Amendment.

In early 2022, Baldwin made a controversial statement, "I’m not discrediting Nazism, fascism, Marxism, or any of those ‘isms’ out there...I have no problem with the education system providing instruction on the existence of those 'isms.' I believe that we’ve gone too far when we take a position on those ‘isms’… We need to be impartial... I’m not sure it’s right for us to determine how that child should think and that’s where I’m trying to provide the guardrails," 

Baldwin later backtracked his statements, saying that "Nazism, Marxism and fascism are a stain on our world history and should be regarded as such, and I failed to adequately articulate that in my comments during the meeting. I believe that kids should learn about these horrible events in history so that we don't experience them again in humanity."

Personal life 
Baldwin and his wife, Jaime, have three children. They live in Noblesville, Indiana.

References 

Republican Party Indiana state senators
Businesspeople from Indiana
Living people
Year of birth missing (living people)
People from Noblesville, Indiana
American municipal police officers
21st-century American businesspeople
21st-century American politicians